Keith S. Downey (born November 10, 1960) is a Minnesota politician and the former chairman of the Republican Party of Minnesota. A former member of the Minnesota House of Representatives, he represented District 41A, which primarily included portions of the cities of Edina and Minnetonka in Hennepin County in the southwestern Twin Cities metropolitan area. He is also a consultant for state and local governments on strategy, operations, and technology.

Early life, education, and career
Downey grew up in Edina, attending Morningside Elementary School, Southview Middle School, and East High School, graduating in 1979. He went on to the University of Wisconsin in Eau Claire, where he received his B.B.A. in 1983 and later his M.I.S. Prior to his current consultant work, he was a partner with Virchow Krause, and also worked for Unisys and Epic Systems.

Minnesota House of Representatives
Downey was first elected to the Minnesota House of Representatives in 2008, defeating nine-term Rep. Ron Erhardt, and was re-elected in 2010. He was a member of the House's K-12 Education Policy and Oversight Committee and Taxes Committee, and also served on the Finance subcommittees for the Early Childhood Finance and Policy Division, on which he was the ranking minority party member, the Higher Education and Workforce Development Finance and Policy Division, and the State Government Finance Division.

2012 Minnesota Senate campaign
In 2012, after incumbent state senator Geoff Michel (Senate District 41) decided not to run for re-election to the Senate, Keith Downey decided not to seek re-election to the House seat (41B) and instead sought election to the State Senate for newly renumbered Senate District 49.  In the general election of November 2012, Downey was defeated by the DFL endorsed candidate Melisa Franzen. The race was the most expensive in state history.

Leadership of the Republican Party of Minnesota
Downey was elected the Chair of the Republican Party of Minnesota on April 6, 2013, succeeding Pat Shortridge.

Personal life
Downey is married to his wife, Amy. They have three children and reside in Edina, Minnesota. He is a member of the Minneapolis Regional and Edina chambers of commerce. From 2004 to 2007, he served the Minneapolis Regional Chamber as a board member, executive committee member and public policy committee chairman. He was a member of the Hennepin County SW Transportation Corridor Policy Advisory Committee from 2006 to 2008. In 2008, Governor Tim Pawlenty appointed him as a board member of the Minnesota Academic Excellence Foundation.

References

External links

 Keith Downey official campaign website
 Rep. Keith Downey profile. Project Vote Smart.
 "Planning for the future: Downey hopes to offer proactive ideas for state's future". Session Weekly. February 6, 2009.

1960 births
21st-century American politicians
American Presbyterians
Living people
Republican Party members of the Minnesota House of Representatives
People from Edina, Minnesota
University of Wisconsin–Eau Claire alumni
State political party chairs of Minnesota